T.S. John (October 21, 1939 – June 9, 2016) was an Indian politician who was a founder member of Kerala Congress party and was its chairman. He was speaker of the Kerala Legislative Assembly and was a minister in A. K. Antony's cabinet in the Government of Kerala.

References

1939 births
2016 deaths
Members of the Kerala Legislative Assembly
Place of birth missing